Pedro do Espirito Santo Sampaio (born December 21, 1997) is a Brazilian singer and music producer, known for the songs "Sentadão", "Bota Pra Tremer" and "Chama Ela", in partnership with the singer Lexa. He is signed to Warner Music Brasil.

Career
At the age of 13, he began to discover his talent for percussion by playing in a bucket and then convinced his father to buy a tantã, repinique, timbal and tambourine. A year later, he was discovered by Victor Junior when he played as a DJ at a party with his father's friend. He started to dedicate himself more until he reached 17 years old, when he definitely joined Dennis DJ's artist team.

He started his artistic career in 2017, posting videos of remixed versions of songs by other artists on YouTube, which made Pedro gain visibility on the internet and was hired to do shows, with songs sung and produced by himself. In December 2018, he signed a contract with the label Warner Music Brasil.

In 2019, he released the single "Sentadão", with the participation of singer Felipe Original and the production of JS o Mão de Ouro, which quickly became one of the radio's most performed songs, reaching the second position in the Spotify ranking in Brazil and occupying the 194th place in the TOP 200 Global.

Discography 
 Chama Meu Nome (2022) (Álbum)
 SAL feat. Pabllo Vittar (2022)
 Olhadinha feat. Zé Felipe (2022)
 Dançarina feat. MC Pedrinho (2022)
 No chão novinha feat. Anitta (2022)
 Vai embora não feat. Zé Vaqueiro (2022)
 Surreal feat. KVSH (2022)
 Que pena feat. MC Don Juan (2022)
 Forasteiro feat. Ferrugem (2022)
 Chama meu nome feat. MC Jefinho (2022)
 Bagunça (2022)
 Galopa (2022)
 Atenção feat. Luísa Sonza (2021)
 Fala mal de mim feat. Daniel Caon e Wesley Safadão (2021)

Awards and nominations

Personal life
In 2022, Sampaio came out as bisexual.

References

1997 births
Living people
21st-century Brazilian male singers
LGBT record producers
Brazilian LGBT singers
Brazilian record producers
LGBT people in Latin music
Bisexual singers